Halimium ocymoides (syn. Cistus algarvensis), the basil-leaved rock rose, is a species of flowering plant in the family Cistaceae, native to Portugal and Spain in the Iberian Peninsula, and northern Morocco in Northwest Africa. The flowers may have a dark brown blotch at the base of each petal.

In cultivation this plant requires a sandy soil and full sun.

References

ocymoides
Flora of Portugal
Flora of Spain
Flora of Morocco